Nepenthes alfredoi  is a tropical pitcher plant endemic to the Philippines on the Mt. Hamiguitan Range on the island of Mindanao in the Philippines, where it grows at elevations of 160–345 m above sea level.

The species was compared to N. zygon. Nepenthes alfredoi can be distinguished from N. zygon as the species have both lower and upper pitchers with well-expressed fringed wings extending for some distance along the tendril, and the male and female inflorescence are two-flowered and rarely single flowered.

Etymology
The specific epithet was derived to honor Alfredo Bolante Sr., a forest guard and well-trained local researcher of Mt. Hamiguitan Range Wildlife Sanctuary who first observed and collected the species.

References

External links
Nepenthes alfredoi (Caryophyllales, Nepenthaceae), A New Species of Pitcher Plant from Mindanao, Philippines
Nepenthes alfredoi
Nepenthaceae - Philippines Plants

alftedoi
Flora of Mindanao
Endemic flora of the Philippines